Migadopiella is a genus of beetles belonging to the family Carabidae.

The species of this genus are found in Southern Australia.

Species
Species:

Migadopiella convexipennis 
Migadopiella octoguttata

References

Carabidae
Carabidae genera